= Lahor, Balochistan =

Lahor
- Location within Pakistan
- Coordinates: 30.33°N 68.47°E
- Country: Pakistan
- Province: Balochistan
- Elevation: 1,313 m (4,308 ft)
- Time zone: UTC+5 (PST)

Lahor is a village in the Balochistan province of Pakistan. It is located at 30°24'0N 68°47'0E with an altitude of 1313 metres (4311 feet).
